Meydanköy can refer to:

 Meydanköy, Çerkeş
 Meydanköy, Çınar
 Meydanköy, Dicle
 Meydanköy, Hınıs